Sarpy County is a county located in the U.S. state of Nebraska. As of the 2020 United States Census, the population was 190,604, making it the third-most populous county in Nebraska. Its county seat is Papillion.

Sarpy County is part of the Omaha-Council Bluffs, NE-IA Metropolitan Statistical Area.

History
This was part of the territory of the Omaha people. Explored in 1805 by the Lewis and Clark expedition following the Louisiana Purchase of 1803 by the United States, this area was settled by European-American fur traders, adventurers, farmers, and finally entrepreneurs.  All initially depended on the Missouri River as a main transportation corridor and source of water. Sarpy County has served as the springboard for Nebraska's settlement and expansion. The county is named for Colonel Peter Sarpy, an early fur trader at Fontenelle's Post in the Bellevue area in the 1840s. He also had Sarpy's post in what became Decatur; Sarpy died in Plattsmouth in 1865.

The area of present Sarpy County was a part of Douglas County until 1 February 1857, when the Territorial Legislature partitioned off that county's southern half and proclaimed it a separate organization.

The Omaha people were forced onto a reservation in the 19th century, losing most of their land to the United States who then opened it for settlement by non-Native Americans who were U.S. citizens or immigrants from certain (mostly European) countries.

Fort Crook, the U.S. Army post south of Bellevue, was established in the 1890s and added Offutt Field in the 1920s. Its Glenn L. Martin Bomber Plant produced over two thousand aircraft during World War II, including the notable B-29's Enola Gay and Bockscar. Offutt Air Force Base was the headquarters of the Strategic Air Command (SAC) during the Cold War and continues as the home of U.S. Strategic Command.

In the Nebraska license plate system, Sarpy County was represented by the prefix "59" (it had the 59th largest number of vehicles registered in the county when the license plate system was established in 1922). Many license plates issued in Sarpy County featured the stacked format of the 59 code. The county, just south of Omaha, had grown significantly in population in the decades following 1922 and therefore required five characters rather than the four allowed by a standard double-digit county code. In 2002, the state discontinued the 1922 system in Sarpy as well as Douglas and Lancaster counties.

Geography
Sarpy County is bounded on the east by the Missouri River; on the south and west by the Platte River. The county's terrain consists of low rolling hills, cut by several small gullies and drainages that move groundwater to one of these rivers. Sarpy is the smallest of Nebraska's 93 counties.

Major highways

  Interstate 80
  U.S. Highway 6
  U.S. Highway 75
  Nebraska Highway 31
  Nebraska Highway 50
  Nebraska Highway 85
  Nebraska Highway 370

Adjacent counties

 Douglas County - north
 Pottawattamie County, Iowa - northeast
 Mills County, Iowa - southeast
 Cass County - south
 Saunders County - west

Protected areas

 Chalco Hills Recreation Area
 Fontenelle Forest Nature Center
 Gifford Point Wildlife Management Area
 Walnut Creek Lake & Recreation

Demographics

As of the 2010 United States Census, there were 158,835 people and 69,851 households.  The population density was 664 people per square mile (197/km2). There were 69,023 housing units at an average density of 289 per square mile (111/km2). The racial makeup of the county was 89.0% White, 4.4% Black or Black or African American, 0.7% Native American, 2.60% Asian, 0.1% Native Hawaiian and Pacific Islander, and 3.20% from two or more races . 9.4% of the population were Hispanic or Latino of any race.

As of the 2000 United States Census, there were 122,595 people, 43,426 households, and 33,220 families in the county. The population density was 510 people per square mile (197/km2). There were 44,981 housing units at an average density of 187 per square mile (72/km2). The racial makeup of the county was 89.18% White, 4.36% Black or African American, 0.42% Native American, 1.90% Asian, 0.09% Pacific Islander, 1.86% from other races, and 2.20% from two or more races. 4.37% of the population were Hispanic or Latino of any race.

There were 43,426 households, out of which 43.00% had children under the age of 18 living with them, 63.80% were married couples living together, 9.60% had a female householder with no husband present, and 23.50% were non-families. 18.40% of all households were made up of individuals, and 4.70% had someone living alone who was 65 years of age or older.  The average household size was 2.79 and the average family size was 3.21.

The county population contained 30.50% under the age of 18, 9.40% from 18 to 24, 33.80% from 25 to 44, 19.70% from 45 to 64, and 6.60% who were 65 years of age or older. The median age was 32 years. For every 100 females there were 98.80 males. For every 100 females age 18 and over, there were 96.20 males.

The median income for a household in the county was $53,804, and the median income for a family was $59,723. Males had a median income of $37,230 versus $26,816 for females. The per capita income for the county was $21,985.  About 3.10% of families and 4.20% of the population were below the poverty line, including 5.30% of those under age 18 and 3.30% of those age 65 or over.

Government and infrastructure
The Sarpy County Sheriff's Department is responsible for enforcing the law within the unincorporated areas of the county. By contract, the department is also responsible for enforcing the law within the city limits of Gretna and Springfield.  The cities of Bellevue, La Vista, and Papillion have their own City Police Departments which are primarily responsible for law enforcement within their respective city limits.  The Sheriff's Department has secondary responsibility for law enforcement within these three cities, providing essentials such as backup support.

The Sarpy County Law Enforcement Center, built in 1989, is located within the campus of the Sarpy County Courthouse in Papillion.  It houses the county's jail facility and the Sarpy County Public Defender's Office.  The Bellevue and LaVista City Police Departments also have their own holding cells.  The county jail was designed to hold 148 people, but the facility frequently holds more than that number.
Fire protection and emergency medical services are provided by a mix of seven full-career, part-time paid, military, and all-volunteer fire departments, representing various municipalities within the county, plus Offutt Air Force Base.

Politics
Sarpy County voters have generally voted Republican in national politics. In only one national election since 1948 has the county selected the Democratic Party candidate (as of 2020). Since 1964, only two Democrats - Barack Obama in 2008 and Joe Biden in 2020 have received at least 40 percent of the county's vote. From 1968 to 2016, Republicans always carried Sarpy County by at least 21 points with the exception of a slight drop to 16 points in 2008. However, in 2020, Republican candidate Donald Trump beat Biden only by 11 points, a 92-year low for a winning Republican candidate.

As of December 2020, Republicans hold a plurality in the county voter registration.

Communities

Cities

 Bellevue
 Gretna
 La Vista
 Papillion (county seat)
 Springfield

Census-designated places

 Beacon View
 Chalco
 La Platte
 Linoma Beach
 Melia
 Offutt AFB
 Richfield

Other unincorporated communities

 Avery
 Gilmore
 Meadow
 Portal

Census divisions
Sarpy County is divided into the following divisions, called precincts, except for the City of Bellevue.

 City of Bellevue
 Bellevue Second I
 Bellevue Second II
 Bellevue Second III
 Bellevue Second IV
 Fairview
 Forest City No. 1
 Forest City No. 2
 Gilmore I
 Gilmore II
 Highland I
 Highland II
 LaPlatte I
 LaPlatte II
 La Vista
 Melia-Forest City
 Papillion
 Papillion Second I
 Papillion Second II
 Platford-Springfield I
 Platford-Springfield II
 Richland I
 Richland II
 Richland III
 Richland IV
 Richland V
 Richland VI
 Richland VII
 Richland VIII
 Springfield

Population ranking
The population ranking of the following table is based on the 2020 census of Sarpy County.

† county seat

See also
 National Register of Historic Places listings in Sarpy County, Nebraska

References

External links

 Sarpy County Nebraska Website
 Sarpy County Chamber of Commerce
 Sarpy County Museum
 Sarpy County Tourism

 
Nebraska counties on the Missouri River
1857 establishments in Nebraska Territory
Populated places established in 1857